The green-chinned euphonia (Euphonia chalybea) is a species of bird in the family Fringillidae.
It is found in far northeastern Argentina, Brazil and Paraguay.
Its natural habitat is subtropical or tropical moist lowland forest.
It is threatened by habitat loss.

References

green-chinned euphonia
Birds of the Atlantic Forest
green-chinned euphonia
Taxonomy articles created by Polbot